Bruno Venturini (26 September 1911 – 7 March 1991) was an Italian footballer who played as a goalkeeper, and who competed with Italy in the 1936 Summer Olympics in Berlin.

Career
Born in Carrara, Venturini began playing football as a goalkeeper for local side Carrarese Calcio. He later played in Serie A for ACF Fiorentina, Sampierdarenese and A.C. Liguria. He also played in Serie B for Spezia Calcio 1906. Venturini was a member of the Italian Olympic team, which won the gold medal in the 1936 Olympic football tournament.

Death
Venturini died at the age of 79 on 7 March 1991, in Lecce.

Honours

International 
Italy
Olympic Gold Medal: 1936

References

External links

Profile at Enciclopediadelcalcio.it
profile

1911 births
1991 deaths
Italian footballers
Footballers at the 1936 Summer Olympics
Olympic footballers of Italy
Olympic gold medalists for Italy
Italy international footballers
Olympic medalists in football
Carrarese Calcio players
ACF Fiorentina players
U.C. Sampdoria players
Spezia Calcio players
Medalists at the 1936 Summer Olympics
Association football goalkeepers